Public Enemy No. 1, or variants, may refer to:

 Public enemy, a term to describe dangerous criminals, particularly in the U.S. in the 1930s

People designated Public Enemy No. 1
 Al Capone, declared "Public Enemy No. 1" by Chicago in 1930
 John Dillinger,  declared "Public Enemy No. 1" by the FBI in 1934
 Pretty Boy Floyd, declared "Public Enemy No. 1" by the FBI after the death of Dillinger
 Baby Face Nelson, declared "Public Enemy No. 1" by the FBI after the death of Floyd
 Alvin Karpis, declared "Public Enemy No. 1" by the FBI after the death of Nelson
 Joaquín "El Chapo" Guzmán, declared "Public Enemy No. 1" by the Chicago Crime Commission in 2013

Arts and entertainment

Film and television
 "Public Enemy #1", a 2002 episode of American Experience
 Mesrine: Public Enemy Number One, the second part of the 2008 film Mesrine
 Public Enemy Number One (film), a 2019 documentary

Music
 "Public Enemy Number One", a song and a character from the 1934 Cole Porter musical Anything Goes
 "Public Enemy No. 1" (Megadeth song), 2011
 Public Enemy #1, a 2007 mixtape by Cam'ron
 "Public Enemy #1", a song by Eminem from the 2006 album Eminem Presents: The Re-Up
 "Public Enemy #1", a song by Mötley Crüe from the 1981 album Too Fast for Love
 "Public Enemy No. 1", a song by Public Enemy from the 1987 album Yo! Bum Rush the Show
 "Public Enemy No. 1", a song by Rory Gallagher from the 1979 album Top Priority
 "Staatsfeind Nr. 1", (German, 'Public Enemy No. 1'), a 2005 album and its title track by Bushido

Other uses
 Public Enemy No. 1 (street gang), a criminal gang in California formed in the 1980s

See also
 Public Enemy (disambiguation)
 Enemy of the people (disambiguation)